Sister Polygon Records was an independent record label run by the band Priests. The label was based in Washington, DC, and released music by Priests, Downtown Boys, Pinkwash, Knife Wife, and Shady Hawkins.

History 
Priests created the label in 2012 in order to release their first single, the "Radiation/Personal Planes" 7-inch. The second release was a cassette of the New York feminist punk band Shady Hawkins' 2013 album Dead To Me.

The members of Priests ran the label out of their houses and apartments.

The label was interested in offering a platform to artists who might not have another way to get their music out. In an interview with the Washington City Paper, Daniele Daniele said: "We're interested in finding people who are underrepresented or weren't signed, making something weird enough where there might not be a normal outlet for it."

Roster
Sister Polygon has released music by Priests, Neonates, Shady Hawkins, Carni Klirs, Dudes, Downtown Boys, Pinkwash, Sneaks, Gauche, Hothead, Snail Mail, and Post Pink.

Discography

References

External links 
 Official site

American independent record labels